Jagannath Singh College, Udharbond, established in 1998, is a major and general degree college situated in Udharbond, Cachar district, Assam. This college is affiliated with the Assam University.

Departments

Arts
Bengali
English
Manipuri
Hindi
History
Economics
Political Science

References

External links

Universities and colleges in Assam
Colleges affiliated to Assam University
Educational institutions established in 1998
1998 establishments in Assam